Connetable is an obelisk and square in Gatchina, Russia, located at the intersection of 25 October Prospect (main city's street) and Krasnoarmeysky Prospect. The author of the project was probably Vincenzo Brenna.

Monumental columns in Russia
Buildings and structures in Gatchina
Cultural heritage monuments of federal significance in Leningrad Oblast